The Wharncliffe Range is a very small mountain range in the Pacific Ranges of the southern Coast Mountains in southwestern British Columbia, Canada, located on the north side of Forward Harbour.

References

Pacific Ranges